The Oriental Hotel is a boutique / lifestyle hotel in Kobe, Japan, reopened on March 3, 2010. The hotel is located in the Kōbe kyū-kyoryūchi 25 bankan building at the junction of Kyōmachi-suji Avenue and Nakamachi-dōri Street in the former Kobe foreign settlement. Dating from 1870, it is one of the most historic hotels not only in Japan, but also in Asia.

History

Concession period

The first advertisement for the Oriental Hotel on the Lot 79 of the Settlement by Van der Vlies & Co. appeared in the Hiogo News, a local English-language newspaper for foreign settlers, on August 3, 1870. The proprietor of the hotel was a former Dutch naval physician Gerardus van der Vlies, who  listed it only in the Japan Directory of 1879.

Van der Vlies had transferred to Nagasaki to serve as the proprietor of the Belle Vue Hotel between May 1879 and 1881. In 1880, the Club Concordia, a social club for foreign settlers, was relocated into the hotel. A French chef Louis Begeux served as the proprietor of the Oriental Hotel around 1882, when he opened another hotel with the same name on the Lot 121. By 1884, van der Vlies, again, had served as the proprietor of the hotel in Nagasaki until he died of cancer in November 1885.

Begeux ran Le Restaurant française on the Lot 122 around 1886, which gained a good reputation for French and western cuisine in short time. In 1887, the Lot 80 was acquired for the Oriental Hotel's expansion, where the Main Hall with 18 rooms and a grand dining hall was built. The hotel was listed once again in the Japan Directory of 1888. Its business went well due to Beguex's culinary delights on its food service until his return home to France in 1890.

Other foreign settlers in Kobe chipped in money, and succeeded the management of the Oriental Hotel. However, the business went down due to the hotel's mediocre food service. Then, L. Beguex, the son of Louis Begeux, was called back, and was hired as a manager. Since the hotel regained its reputation for its delighted cuisine and the business eventually recovered. In 1893, the Lot 87 was purchased for the Annex with 3 floors and a basement floor, which accommodated 36 rooms and a billiard room.

Eventually, the Oriental Hotel has been acquired by two British settlers, Arthur Hasketh Groom and Edward Hazlett Hunter, and other foreign settlers in 1897. The hotel was made into a limited company: the Oriental･Hotel, Ltd. C. N. Cross served the first president of the company, and Groom served the president sometime until 1916.

End of foreign settlers hotel

Restaurants 
The Oriental Hotel has 4 food and beverage outlets.
MAIN DINING by THE HOUSE OF PACIFIC, 17th Floor – Main restaurant
Sushi KANBE, 17th Floor – produced by Sushi Azabu
Steak House Medium Rare, 17th Floor – grilled dishes
The Bar J. W. Hart, 17th Floor – Bar

See also

Rokkosan Oriental Hotel
Oriental Hotel Maiko Villa
Shinkobe Oriental Hotel
Seishin Oriental Hotel
Shin-Urayasu Oriental Hotel
Kobe Meriken Park Oriental Hotel
Namba Oriental Hotel

External links
Oriental Hotel Website

Notes and references 

Hotels in Kobe
Buildings and structures in Kobe
Hotels established in 1870